The Passions are an American doo-wop group from Bensonhurst, Brooklyn. The quintet recorded a few demos in 1958, at which time Tony, Albee and Vinny began looking for replacements who were more career-minded. Another group in Bensonhurst had what they needed; when the three Sinceres heard Runarounds lead singer Jimmy Gallagher, they knew he was the one for them (Jimmy’s previous group, the Palladiyms, included Joe DiBenedetto, who later formed "The Four-evers"). The Sinceres weren’t sure how to approach Jimmy, so they followed him home one night and knocked on his door. After convincing his mother that they only wanted to sing with her son, not mug him, the foursome went to a nearby park and ended up harmonizing for hours. They were now a quartet, with Jimmy on lead, Tony on first tenor, Albee on second tenor, and Vinnie on baritone. In 1959, while the Mystics were recording "Hushabye" at their first session, their friend Tony Armato was there cheering them on promoting his own group to their manager, Jim Gribble. Gribble soon signed the Sinceres and renamed them the Passions. He gave them a demo by a duo of studio singers who called themselves the Cousins. The song was "Just to Be with You" written by Mary Kalfin. The Cousins were Paul Simon and Carole King. By the time the group recorded "Gloria" Vinny had left and been replaced by Gallagher’s friend Lou Rotondo. Also in 1960 Lou Rotondo and Albie Galione, along with Albie Contrera of the Mystics, sang behind Clay Cole on "Here, There, Everywhere" (Roulette), single that became popular in the New York area. Audicon Records lost the group’s next release, the harmony rocker "Made for Lovers." The group recorded a few more sides for Audicon which were leased to Jubilee and Octavia. Released in August 1959 on Sol Winkler’s Audicon label, the Passions’ impeccable harmonies and Gallagher’s impassioned lead put "Just to Be with You" on radios across America. It was a top 20 hit in many eastern cities and it charted nationally, rising to number 69. The follow-up out of Audicon’s 1674 Broadway digs was twice as good. Both sides—the harmony filled "I Only Want You" and the beautiful Billy Dawn Smith ballad "This Is My Love" –vied for radio play and sales throughout the states. They were managed by Jim Gribble who managed several doo-wop groups including the Mystics and The Jarmels, and worked with producer songwriter Stan Vincent. In the late 1990s, they reunited with the Mystics and the Classics for the Brooklyn Reunion Show. Lead singer Jimmy Gallagher left the Passions in 1960 to join the Navy, but later sang with The Legends of Doo Wop in 1998.

Original members
Jimmy Gallagher (Lead)
Albie Gallone (Second Tenor)
Vinnie Acierno (Baritone)
Tony Armato (First Tenor)
Lou Rotondo (Baritone / Lead - replaced Vinnie Acierno in 1960)

Discography
1958 - "Tango Of Love" / "Nervous About Love" (Dore 505)
1959 - "Just To Be With You" / "Oh Melancholy Me" (Audicon 102)
1960 - "I Only Want You" / "This Is My Love" (Audicon 105)
1960 - "Gloria" / "Jungle Drums" (Audicon 106)
1960 - "Beautiful Dreamer" / "One Look At You Is All It Look" (Audicon 108)
1960 - "Made For Lovers" / "You Don't Love Me Anymore" (Audicon 112)
1961 - "I Gotta Know" / "Aphrodite" (Octavia 8005)
1962 - "Lonely Road" / "One Look At You Is All It Look" (Jubilee 5406)
1963 - "The Bully" / "Empty Seat" (ABC 10436)
1963 - "Sixteen Candles" / "The Third Floor" (instrumental) (Diamond 146)

References

Musical groups from Brooklyn
Doo-wop groups